Synchiropus kamoharai is a species of fish in the family Callionymidae, the dragonets.

Etymology
The fish is named in honor of ichthyologist Toshiji Kamohara (1901–1972), of the Kochi University, who was the first to find and record this species.

References

kamoharai
Taxa named by Tetsuji Nakabo
Fish described in 1981